Xavier Patricio Pérez Álvarez (Buenos Aires, April 11, 1951- Caldes de Montbui, Barcelona, October 18, 1990), known as Gato Pérez, was a musician of Argentine origin settled in Catalonia, who stood out, especially in the musical genre of the Catalan rumba, which he merged with salsa, with an original style. He was bass, guitar, singer and composer.

Biography 
Although he was born in Buenos Aires, he came from Spanish families who emigrated after the civil war. His paternal grandparents were from Asturias and La Rioja; and his maternal grandparents were from León and Burgos. In Madrid his paternal grandfather owned a fleet of cabs for the diplomatic corps. At the beginning of the war, he fled to Barcelona, where he worked in an aeronautical factory run by Russians and went to the refugee camps in the south of France. After falling ill with tuberculosis he returned to his family in Barcelona, a right-wing family. In 1948 his father decided to emigrate to Buenos Aires where he met El Gato's mother, who was a pianist.

Gato Pérez was born in Buenos Aires, in a cesarean birth. He grew up in an upper-middle-class neighborhood and was educated in a bilingual school attended by the children of the industrial and financial bourgeoisie of Buenos Aires, whom he detested. His first contact with music was with his grandfather; they listened together to the radio and the serials of the sixties. It was the radio that introduced him to the rock and roll of Bill Haley and His Comets, which was a complete epiphany for the artist. His first performance was at the English school prom playing Claudette and Wake up little Susie by the Everly Brothers. Rock and roll had arrived much earlier in Argentina and the Argentine musicians learned to play much earlier, and also burned stages earlier than the Spaniards, which would be decisive for the fact that it was the same Argentines who introduced a fresh and Hispanic rock in the Spain of the Transition. Before arriving in Spain, he was part of a pampera music group, Los Baguales, and upon arriving in Barcelona he followed the rock group "Los Salvajes"and "Los Cheyennes".

Artistic background 
He arrived in Barcelona in 1966 with his mother to join his father who had made the trip earlier. After finishing high school he settled for a while in London, with the aim of getting a job in a record company, but he had no luck and returned to Barcelona, where he worked as a butler because of his perfect English. His nickname, "Gato", came from his round face.

The first group he was part of in Barcelona was "Revelación Mesmérica", with Rafael Zaragoza, which was later called "Nosaltres" and finally "Pérez y Zaragoza", a Simon & Garfunkel type.

From the beginning of the 1970s his musical restlessness led him to form, with other musicians, different bands such as "Slo-Blo" (country rock, and an attempt to emulate the Flying Burrito Brothers, which was the first group to perform in the Zeleste hall in Barcelona) and "Secta Sónica" (jazz rock, partly derived from the previous one). He was one of the driving forces behind the Orquestra Platería, a salsa music and dance band created for street parties in Barcelona in 1974. 

In 1977 he began experimenting with Catalan rumba and later released his first two albums (Carabruta and Romesco), followed by the more commercial Atalaya."An Argentine prophet had to come to unite the gypsies here" (Carlos Flaviá).In 1981 Gato Pérez suffers a heart attack, begins to have serious health problems and the fatigue caused by his heart problems forces him to give up alcohol. His next albums were composed, in his own words, 'under the effects of mineral water'.

Gato Pérez has been recognized as the renovator of the Catalan rumba, precisely at a time when it was going through its lowest hours, due to the strength of the very dynamic movida in Madrid. The quality of his lyrics and the fusion he achieves between rumba and other contemporary popular music, such as rock, salsa or even bolero, stand out.

According to the artist:The Catalan rumba is the characteristic and original music of urban Barcelona. It was born from a marginalized but deeply-rooted and distinctly Barcelona community and has a very attractive stamp, somewhere between gypsy, flamenco and Central American, which cannot be compared to anything known (Gato Perez).In addition, as a composer and lyricist, he introduced in his songs the first criticisms of the then incipient symptoms of discrimination against African workers and gypsy communities, as well as criticizing certain pollution problems of an idyllic Mediterranean city.

His health problems would not leave him until his death, victim of a myocardial infarction, in 1990. Subsequently, his figure has been the subject of numerous tributes from the music profession. Ventura Pons, who already counted on Gato Pérez for the soundtrack of his film La rubia del bar, has directed a documentary about his life, entitled El gran Gato.

Marcos Ordóñez wrote his biography with the title Gato Pérez, la rumba como ética (Júcar, 1987).

Ten years after his death, his friends and admirers joined together in a concert in his honor, with the participation of: Carme Canela, Miqui Puig, Jaume Sisa, Ia Clua, Manel Joseph, Quintín Cabrera, Sergio Makaroff, the Som La Rumba troupe, the Manolos 2000, Marina Rosell, Yumitus, Rafaelito Salazar and Son Com Son. The concert was held at the Sala Luz de Gas in Barcelona and was presented by Ángel Casas, Pepe Rubianes and Carles Flaviá.

In 2010, also in Barcelona's Gracia neighborhood, a new tribute, Gatos que bailan Pérez por los tejados, was held during the neighborhood's main festivities.

Discography

With Secta Sónica 

 Fred Pedralbes (1976) (Reissued in CD and digital format by Picap 2010)
 Astroferia (1977) (Reissued in CD and digital format by Picap 2010)

Guitars: Jordi Bonell, Rafael Zaragoza ("Zarita") and Víctor Cortina. Bass: Javier Patricio "Gato" Pérez. Drums: Toni Arasil and Jordi Vilella.

As Gato Perez 

 Carabruta (1978)
 Romesco (1979; re-released in CD and digital format by Picap, 2007)
 Atalaya (1981)
 Prohibido maltratar a los gatos (1982)
 Flaires de Barcelunya (1982)
 Música (1983)
 Ke imbenten ellos (1984)
 Gato x Gato (1986; reissued in CD and digital format by Picap, 2003)
 La rubia del bar (1986; reissued in digital format by Picap, 2003)
 Ten (1987; reissued in CD and digital format by Picap, 2003)
 Fenicia (1990)
 Sabor de barrio (compilation, 1991)

Collaborations 

 Tocats de Nadal - collective album (1988)

Tributes to Gato Pérez 

 Orquesta Platería: Gatísimo (2002)
 Miscellaneous: El gran Gato, soundtrack of the film El gran Gato, directed by Ventura Pons (2003).
 Derrumband: & Los Amigos de Siempre (2011)
 Derrumband: A Barcelunya (2017). Tribute album to the LP Flaires de Barcelunya

Most outstanding songs 

 "Ja soc aquí"
 "Viejos automóviles"
 "La rumba de Barcelona"
 "El ventilador"
 "Rumba del's 60"
 "Todos los gatos son Pardos"
 "La curva del Morrot"
 "Gitanitos y morenos"
 "Se fuerza la máquina"
 "La rumba de aquí"
 "Luna brava"
 "Quise ser tu amigo"
 "El mismo de antes"

References

External links 
Official site

1951 births
1990 deaths